The 2020 season is SCG Muangthong United Football Club's 14th existence in the new era since they took over from Nongchok Pittaya Nusorn Football Club in 2007. It is the 4th season in the Thai League and the club's 12th consecutive season in the top flight of the Thai football league system since promoted in the 2009 season.

On March 1, all of Thai League 1 matches between 7 and 31 march will be played behind closed doors as broadcast only events. However, on March 4, the decision changed to postpone all of matches prior to 18 April due to the coronavirus pandemic in Thailand.

It was later confirmed that the match will restarted in September 2020 and end in May 2021.

Squad

Transfer

Pre-season transfer

In 

Note 1: Jesse Curran moves to Udon Thani F.C. on loan after failure to obtain the Philippines passport so as to be eligible to be registered as SEA player

Out

Loan Out

Return from loan

Mid-season transfer

In

Loan In

Out

Return from loan

Loan Out

Friendlies

Pre-Season Friendly

Leo Cup 2020 Thailand - 22 to 30 January

In-Season Friendly

Mid-Season Friendly

Mid-Season Break Friendly

Competitions

Thai League 1

s

Thai FA Cup

Thai League Cup

Team statistics

Appearances and goals

Notes

References 

MTU
Muangthong United F.C. seasons